Major Dhyan Chand Hockey Stadium is a hockey ground in Jhansi, India. The stadium is mostly used for Hockey purposes and has got coaching facility. The stadium is named after Major Dhyan Chand who lived in Jhansi.

The stadium was a cricket stadium in past and had hosted two official cricket matches. The stadium was used by Railways cricket team. In 1903, the stadium hosted a cricket match when home side Bundelkhand cricket team played against Oxford University Authentics. The stadium hosted its one and only cricket match Railways cricket team played against Madhya Pradesh cricket team in 1984 since then the stadium is unused for cricket.

References

External links
 Cricinfo
 Wikimapia

Buildings and structures in Jhansi
Field hockey venues in India
Athletics (track and field) venues in India
Multi-purpose stadiums in India
Sports venues in Uttar Pradesh
Monuments and memorials to Dhyan Chand
Sports venues completed in 1902
1902 establishments in India
20th-century architecture in India